The 1966 U.S. National Championships (now known as the US Open) was a tennis tournament that took place on the outdoor grass courts at the West Side Tennis Club, Forest Hills in New York City, United States. The tournament ran from 1 September until 11 September. It was the 86th staging of the U.S. National Championships, and the fourth Grand Slam tennis event of 1966.

Finals

Men's singles

 Fred Stolle defeated  John Newcombe  4–6, 12–10, 6–3, 6–4

Women's singles

 Maria Bueno defeated  Nancy Richey 6–3, 6–1

Men's doubles
 Roy Emerson /  Fred Stolle defeated   Clark Graebner /  Dennis Ralston 6–4, 6–4, 6–4

Women's doubles
 Maria Bueno /  Nancy Richey defeated  Rosie Casals /  Billie Jean King 6–3, 6–4

Mixed doubles
 Donna Floyd-Fales /  Owen Davidson defeated  Carol Hanks Aucamp /  Ed Rubinoff 6–1, 6–3

References

External links
Official US Open website

 
U.S. National Championships
U.S. National Championships (tennis) by year
U.S. National Championships (tennis)
U.S. National Championships (tennis)
U.S. National Championships (tennis)